Samarpane is a 1983 Indian Kannada-language film based on the novel of the same name by Usha Navratnaram, directed by H. R. Bhargava and produced by P. Krishnaraj. The film stars Aarathi in the main role of the female protagonist Sarla opposite Rajeev and Jai Jagadish. The film has musical score by M. Ranga Rao. Aarathi who had previously starred in two movies based on Usha Navratnaram's novels (Hombisilu and Preetisi Nodu) was signed for the role. Ramakrishna who was to play the antagonist was replaced by Jai Jagdish since Ramakrishna had played the role of Aarathi's son (Ranganayaki) only a couple of years earlier and the director felt that the audience may not accept the pairing.

Cast

Aarathi
Rajeev
Jai Jagadish
Charan Raj
K. S. Ashwath
Leelavathi
Musuri Krishnamurthy
Pramila Joshai
Ashalatha
Kaminidharan
Lokanath in Guest Appearance
Uma Shivakumar in Guest Appearance
Shivaram in Guest Appearance
Baby Rekha
Baby Suma

Soundtrack
The music was composed by M. Ranga Rao.

References

External links
 

1983 films
1980s Kannada-language films
Films scored by M. Ranga Rao
Films directed by H. R. Bhargava